The 1990 FIFA World Cup qualification UEFA Group 6 was a UEFA qualifying group for the 1990 FIFA World Cup. The group consisted of Hungary, Malta, Northern Ireland, Spain and the Republic of Ireland.

The group was won by Spain, who qualified for the 1990 FIFA World Cup. The Republic of Ireland also qualified as runners-up for their first ever World Cup Finals.

Standings

Results

Goalscorers
There were 47 goals scored during the 20 games, an average of 2.35 goals per game.

5 goals

 Manolo
 Míchel

3 goals

 Carmel Busuttil
 Emilio Butragueño

2 goals

 Attila Pintér
 István Vincze
 John Aldridge
 Tony Cascarino
 Ray Houghton
 Colin Clarke

1 goal

 Imre Boda
 György Bognár
 József Kiprich
 Kálmán Kovács
 Paul McGrath
 Kevin Moran
 Ronnie Whelan
 Michael O'Neill
 Steve Penney
 Jimmy Quinn
 Norman Whiteside
 Genar Andrinúa
 Txiki Begiristain
 Fernando
 Juanito
 Julio Salinas

1 own goal

 Alan McDonald (playing against Spain)
 Anton Rogan (playing against Spain)
 Míchel (playing against Ireland)

References

6
1988–89 in Republic of Ireland association football
Qual
1988–89 in Spanish football
Qual
1988–89 in Northern Ireland association football
1989–90 in Northern Ireland association football
1988–89 in Hungarian football
1989–90 in Hungarian football
1988–89 in Maltese football
1989–90 in Maltese football
1987–88 in Maltese football
1987–88 in Northern Ireland association football